René Barbera is a Mexican-American tenor. He was the recipient of three awards of the Operalia Competition in 2011, and winner of the Metropolitan Opera National Council Audition in 2008.

Roles 

 Ernesto debut in Donizetti's Don Pasquale - Wiener Staatsoper
Il Conte d’Almaviva debut in Rossini's Il barbiere di Siviglia - Dutch National Opera
Riccardo Percy debut in Donizetti's Anna Bolena - Teatro dell’Opera di Roma
Title role debut in Mozart’s Idomeneo - Teatro Massimo
Idamore debut in Donizetti’s Il Paria - Opera Rara
Il Conte d’Almaviva in Il barbiere di Siviglia - Japanese debut at the New National Theatre
Elvino in Bellini’s La Sonnambula - Debut at the Opéra Royal de Wallonie
Metropolitan Opera debut as Lindoro in L'Italiana in Algeri 
Teatro alla Scala debut as Ernesto in Don Pasquale

Awards 

 2008 - Winner of the Metropolitan Opera National Council Audition
 2011 - Recipient of three awards of the Operalia Competition

References

External links 
Official website for René Barbera

American operatic tenors
Living people
Year of birth missing (living people)
Operalia, The World Opera Competition prize-winners
Winners of the Metropolitan Opera National Council Auditions
21st-century American male opera singers
American musicians of Mexican descent